San Diego Surf is a 1968 feature film directed by Andy Warhol and Paul Morrissey, and filmed in La Jolla, California in May 1968. On June 3, 1968, Warhol was shot by Valerie Solanas, bringing work on the film to a halt. In 1996, the Andy Warhol Foundation commissioned Morrissey to "finish editing the film based on Warhol's notes".

The film stars Viva, Taylor Mead, Joe Dallesandro, Ingrid Superstar, Tom Hompertz, Eric Emerson, Nawana Davis, Michael Boosin, and Louis Waldon. The film was a follow-up to Warhol's Lonesome Cowboys (released December 1967) with much of the same cast.

Plot
Mr. and Mrs. Mead (Mead and Viva) are a married couple renting a seaside mansion to a group of young male surfers. Their daughter (Ingrid Superstar) is pregnant and on the hunt for a husband. Mr. Mead, who is gay, tries to pawn her off to one of the surfers.

Meanwhile, Viva wants a divorce from her husband, who wants a surfer of his own. Tom (Hompertz), a surfer, is inveigled by Mr. Mead to urinate on him. In a close-up, Mr. Mead receives Tom's offering ecstatically, after which he comments, "I'm a real surfer now."

Premiere
The film premiered at the Museum of Modern Art in New York City on October 16, 2012.

See also
List of American films of 1968
Andy Warhol filmography

References

External links
San Diego Surf at IMDB
David Ng, "Warhol's San Diego Surf Finally Coming to the West Coast", Los Angeles Times (January 28, 2013)
San Diego Surf at WarholStars

1968 films
Films directed by Andy Warhol
Films directed by Paul Morrissey
American surfing films
Films set in San Diego
La Jolla, San Diego
2010s English-language films
1960s English-language films
1960s American films
2010s American films